The aquatics events at the 2009 Southeast Asian Games included swimming, diving and water polo. The events were held at the Aquatic Center, Swimming Pool, National Sports Complex, Laos.

Swimming

Diving
The diving events at the 2009 Southeast Asian Games took place at the Swimming Pool, National Sports Complex. The Diving events were held from 11 December to 14 December, with 8 gold medals up for contention.

Medal table

Men's events

3 meter springboard
December 12

10 meter platform 
December 11

3 meter synchronized springboard
December 13

10 meter synchronised platform 
December 14

Women's events

3 meter springboard
December 11

10 meter platform 
December 12

3 meter synchronized springboard
December 14

10 meter synchronized platform 
December 13

Water polo
The Water polo events was held from 5 December to 7 December 2009. Four teams were in competition in a round-robin format, with defending champion Singapore retaining its title which it has won 23 times consecutively since Singapore gained independence in 1965, inclusive of the current games.

Medal table

Round-robin
Standings

Results

External links
Southeast Asian Games Official Results

References

 
2009 Southeast Asian Games events
2009 in water sports
2009